WBPD may refer to:

 UDP-2-acetamido-3-amino-2,3-dideoxy-glucuronate N-acetyltransferase, an enzyme
 Westhampton Beach Police Department